Listen & Forgive is the third studio album by American pop punk band Transit.

Background
It is their first release with Rise Records, with whom they signed in December 2010. It was revealed that the band were in the process of writing their next album, planned for release in the fall. In March and April 2011, the band went on tour with Senses Fail. Following this, the band made an appearance at Bled Fest in May. While expressing their interest to open for Patrick Stump's solo show in 2011, they felt that their music was not suitable to open for Stump, and instead brought Stump aboard to feature on "All Your Heart".

Release
In July, the group supported Bayside on their headlining US tour. Listen & Forgive was released on October 4, 2011. In October and November, the band supported Saves the Day and Bayside on their co-headlining US tour. To coincide with the tour, the groups each contributed one track to a four-way split single. Transit's contribution was "The Answer Comes in Time". In December, the band supported Four Year Strong on their brief holiday tour dubbed It's a Wonderful Gig Life. In March and April 2012, the band supported The Wonder Years on the Glamour Kills Spring 2012 tour in the US. To promote the tour, a compilation album was released that featured the bands covering one of the other bands' songs. Transit's contribution was a cover of the Polar Bear Club track "Resent and Resistance". In October, the band supported Lower Than Atlantis on their headlining UK tour.

Track listing

References

2011 albums
Transit (band) albums
Rise Records albums